World Cancer Research Fund International is a not-for-profit association related to cancer prevention research related to diet, weight and physical activity.

See also
 "Food, Nutrition, Physical Activity and the Prevention of Cancer: a Global Perspective" – an expert report published by the World Cancer Research Fund global network in 2007

References

External links
Official website

Cancer organisations based in the United Kingdom
Cancer research
International medical and health organizations